Wahpaton 94A is an Indian reserve of the Wahpeton Dakota Nation in Saskatchewan. It is 10 kilometres north of Prince Albert. In the 2016 Canadian Census, it recorded a population of 309 living in 70 of its 80 total private dwellings. In the same year, its Community Well-Being index was calculated at 58 of 100, compared to 58.4 for the average First Nations community and 77.5 for the average non-Indigenous community.

References

Indian reserves in Saskatchewan
Division No. 15, Saskatchewan
Santee Dakota